"Won't Let You Down" is a song by Australian hip hop group Hilltop Hoods featuring Irish-English singer-songwriter Maverick Sabre, released through Golden Era Records on 27 June 2014 as the lead single from their seventh studio album Walking Under Stars (2014).

"Won't Let You Down" peaked at number 17 on the ARIA Singles Chart, marking the group's fifth top 40 single.

Music video
The music video was released on 19 August 2014. It currently has over six million YouTube views.

Charts

Certifications

References

2014 singles
2014 songs
Hilltop Hoods songs
Golden Era Records singles
Maverick Sabre songs
Songs written by Maverick Sabre